Ahkeela Darcel Mollon (born 2 April 1985), also known as Darcel Mollon, is a Trinidadian football coach and former player who she played as a forward. She has been a member of the Trinidad and Tobago women's national team.

International goals
Scores and results list Trinidad and Tobago' goal tally first.

References

External links 
 

1985 births
Living people
Women's association football forwards
Trinidad and Tobago women's footballers
People from Chaguanas
Trinidad and Tobago women's international footballers
Pan American Games competitors for Trinidad and Tobago
Footballers at the 2011 Pan American Games
Footballers at the 2015 Pan American Games
Competitors at the 2010 Central American and Caribbean Games
Young Harris Mountain Lions women's soccer players
South Carolina Gamecocks women's soccer players
Charlotte Lady Eagles players
Damallsvenskan players
Djurgårdens IF Fotboll (women) players
Ahkeela Mollon
Ahkeela Mollon
Ahkeela Mollon
Trinidad and Tobago expatriate women's footballers
Trinidad and Tobago expatriate sportspeople in the United States
Expatriate women's soccer players in the United States
Trinidad and Tobago expatriate sportspeople in Sweden
Expatriate women's footballers in Sweden
Ahkeela Mollon
Ahkeela Mollon
Trinidad and Tobago twins